The Men's Field Hockey Olympic Qualifier for the 2000 Summer Olympics was held in Osaka, Japan, from March 9–20, 2000. Twelve nations took part, and they played a round robin divided into two groups. The top six teams qualify through to the Olympics.

Results

Preliminary round

Pool A

Pool B

Thursday March 9, 2000

Friday March 10, 2000

Saturday March 11, 2000

Sunday March 12, 2000

Monday March 13, 2000

Tuesday March 14, 2000

Wednesday March 15, 2000

Thursday March 16, 2000

Play-offs
Saturday March 18, 2000

Sunday March 19, 2000

Monday March 20, 2000

See also
2000 Women's Field Hockey Olympic Qualifier

References
Men's Olympic Qualifying Tournament

Hockey, men's qualifier
 Men
International field hockey competitions hosted by Japan
Field hockey at the Summer Olympics – Men's qualification tournaments